Get Growing is a New Zealand gardening television program. The program focuses on giving gardens complete makeovers. It premiered on Choice TV on 17 October 2014. A second series aired.

References

2014 New Zealand television series debuts
Gardening in New Zealand
Choice TV original programming